is a subprefecture of Hokkaido Prefecture, Japan. As of 2004 it had a population of 456,621 and an area of 3,715.38 km2.

Hakodate Airport is located in the City of Hakodate.

Geography 
The subprefecture is located on the Oshima Peninsula.

Municipalities

Mergers

History
1897: Hakodate Subprefecture, Kameda Subprefecture, and Matsumae Subprefecture was established.
1899: Hakodate Subprefecture was abolished. Kameda Subprefecture was transferred to Hakodate and renamed Hakodate Subprefecture.
1903: Matsumae Subprefecture was merged into Hakodate Subprefecture.
1922: Hakodate Subprefecture changed its name to Oshima Subprefecture.

External links

 Official website

(Matsumae General Branch Office)

Subprefectures in Hokkaido